Jane Austen College is a secondary free school located in Norwich, owned by the Inspiration Trust, that opened in September 2014. The school's Principal is Antony Little.

History
Plans for the school were announced in March 2013 with the intention to locate in central Norwich. Jane Austen College was approved by the Department for Education, on 22 May 2013, to open in September 2014.

Academic organisation
The school has an admission number of 180 students per year between Years 7 and 11, and a smaller sixth form. There is an extended school day, with optional sessions running until 5.30pm three days a week for students to complete homework on site. Within the school day students spend dedicated time on an ‘elective’ until year 11, activity of their choice such as choir, football, Dungeons and Dragons, dancing or STEM studies. There is a shorter end time on Fridays of 3.30pm for those students who have completed their week's homework.

The school has chosen to compress Key Stage 3 into 2 years, and operate a three-year Key Stage 4 when students are studying GCSEs.

Qualifications offered

The school offers a range of GCSEs with core subjects comprising English, maths, science, PE, humanities, and modern foreign languages as well as options including Latin, engineering, dance, drama, business studies and computer science. Further qualifications such as the Arts Awards or Duke of Edinburgh's Award are also available through the school's electives programme.

A Level options at the sixth form focus on arts, English, drama, and the humanities, and there is a reciprocal arrangement with nearby Sir Isaac Newton Sixth Form for students who wish to study science, psychology, computer science or maths. In 2018, 88% of A Level students achieved an A* - C grade.

Physical education
Pupils travel to the University of East Anglia or The Hewett Academy for sports lessons and some electives. The facilities available at those sites allow teaching of units such as football, hockey, netball and swimming. In 2018 the Eileen Ash Sports Hall was opened on the edge of The Hewett Academy site for use by Jane Austen College.

Ofsted judgements
As of 2021, the school's first and so far only Ofsted inspection was in 2016, with an overall judgement of Good.

References

External links
 
 Jane Austen College at Inspiration Trust

Free schools in England
Schools in Norwich
Secondary schools in Norfolk
2014 establishments in England
Inspiration Trust
Educational institutions established in 2014